Riddleville is a town in Washington County, Georgia, United States. The population was 124 at the 2000 census.

History
The community was named after Anderson Riddle, the original owner of the town site. The Georgia General Assembly incorporated Riddleville as a town in 1859.

Geography

Riddleville is located at  (32.906541, -82.664385).

Demographics

At the 2000 census there were 124 people, 39 households, and 34 families living in the town. The racial makeup of the town was 70.97% White and 29.03% African American.
Of the 39 households 43.6% had children under the age of 18 living with them, 71.8% were married couples living together, 7.7% had a female householder with no husband present, and 10.3% were non-families. 7.7% of households were one person and 2.6% were one person aged 65 or older. The average household size was 3.18 and the average family size was 3.29.

The age distribution was 31.5% under the age of 18, 11.3% from 18 to 24, 25.0% from 25 to 44, 21.8% from 45 to 64, and 10.5% 65 or older. The median age was 33 years. For every 100 females, there were 85.1 males. For every 100 females age 18 and over, there were 97.7 males.

The median household income was $39,167 and the median family income  was $42,500. Males had a median income of $36,250 versus $22,500 for females. The per capita income for the town was $15,012. There were no families and 2.9% of the population living below the poverty line, including no under eighteens and none of those over 64.

See also

 Central Savannah River Area

References

Towns in Washington County, Georgia
Towns in Georgia (U.S. state)